The 1984 European Rallycross Championship season was the ninth season of the FIA European Rallycross Championship under that name and the twelfth season overall since it began as the Embassy/ERA European Rallycross Championship. It was held across nine rounds starting at the Nordring in Austria on April 8 and ending at the Lyngås Motorbane in Norway on October 7.

The champions were Anders Norstedt (Division 1) and Martin Schanche (Division 2). Schanche won six of the nine rounds on the Division 2 schedule to guarantee himself the title. In Division 1 Norstedt had an equal number of wins to his closest title rival Lars Nyström. The highest placed driver with no wins in any class was Olle Arnesson, the Division 2 third-placer.

Calendar

Standings

Div. 1

Drivers

Div. 1

Div. 2

References
Season overview

1984 in motorsport
1984 in European sport
European Rallycross Championship seasons